Almost Human is a 1927 American silent drama film directed by Frank Urson, starring Vera Reynolds and Kenneth Thomson,  produced by Cecil B. DeMille and William C. de Mille, and distributed through Pathé Exchange. The picture was based upon a novel by Richard Harding Davis entitled The Bar Sinister.

Cast 
 Vera Reynolds as Mary Kelly
 Kenneth Thomson as John Livingston
 Majel Coleman as Cecile Adams
 Claire McDowell as Mrs. Livingston
 Ethel Wales as Katie
 Fred Walton as Doctor
 Hank as Pal, a dog
 Paul as Regent Royal, a dog
 Trixie as Maggie, a dog

Preservation status
The film survives in the UCLA Film and Television Archive.

References

External links 

1927 drama films
American silent feature films
American black-and-white films
Films based on American novels
Films about dogs
Pathé Exchange films
1927 films
1920s English-language films
Films directed by Frank Urson
Silent American drama films
1920s American films